The Rock2Wgtn Festival was a two-day music festival. It is the second major music festival to be held in New Zealand, the first being the Big Day Out, but Rock2Wgtn is the first purely metal/rock festival. It is also the first two-day festival, as the Big Day Out is held over a single day. It was held at the Westpac Stadium, informally known as The Cake Tin due to the shape of the building.

Rock2Wgtn 2008

The Rock2Wgtn Festival was held Easter 2008. The headliners were Kiss and Ozzy Osbourne.  The other bands to play were Whitesnake, Lordi, Alice Cooper, and Poison.

New Zealand bands The Valves, Sonic Altar, and The Symphony of Screams played support over the 2 nights.

The special effects were supplied by Weta Workshop who have previously supplied effects for movies such as The Lord of The Rings.

Attendance over the 2 days was around 50,000.

Band Line Ups (as of show)

Future

The 2008 Rock2Wgtn was the last one of its kind in Wellington, with it being announced that the next Rock2Wgtn will be in another city (with the name being changed to suit). On the promoters website, http://www.capitalc.co.nz/, an image is shown with the text "In 2009 we are bringing it on again! Not Wellington... not easter... new artists!", along with a new logo that says "Rock2????". However mid-2009 it got changed to Rock22010 with no word on delays. Still stating New Artist, New City, New Date.  As of September 2011 the Rock2Wgtn website doesn't even exist.

References

External links
Official Website
Relevant article about the event
Another article about the event
Osbournes leave NZ
Review of the event

Heavy metal festivals in New Zealand
Rock festivals in New Zealand
Festivals in Wellington